Chickenpox is a highly contagious illness caused by primary infection with varicella zoster virus.

Chickenpox may also refer to:
Chickenpox (South Park), an episode of the American television series South Park
Chickenpox (band), a Swedish ska band
"Chicken Pox", a song from the album Melting Pot by Booker T. & the MGs
"Chicken Pox", a song from the album Let Me Introduce My Friends by the band I'm From Barcelona